Mark Dixon may refer to:
 Mark Dixon (American football) (born 1970), American football player
 Mark Dixon (businessman), English founder of Regus
 Mark "Hammer" Dixon, Australian bodyguard and boxer

See also
 Mark Dickson (disambiguation)